The Black Tulip (French: La Tulipe noire) is a French-Italian-Spanish film which reused some names in the novel of the same title by Alexandre Dumas but its story does not follow the novel. It is, essentially, a star vehicle for the popular French actor Alain Delon.

Like the popular European Karl May movies of the same time, the script actually used only the main characters of a popular novel, but didn't stick to the original story.

Synopsis
In June 1789 in the town of Roussillon, aristocrat Guillaume de Saint Preux leads a double life as a masked bandit known as the Black Tulip. The Black Tulip only robs rich aristocrats, so the local peasants regard him as a hero. Baron La Mouche is convinced Guillaume is the Tulip. During a robbery, he scars the Tulip's face, and hopes to use this to expose Guillaume.

Guillaume asks his twin brother Julien to impersonate him. Julien is much more gentler and idealistic than his brother. While the impersonation goes well at first, Julien is shocked to discover that Guillaume robs aristocrats for the thrill and the money, not for political reasons.

Julien falls in love with a peasant girl called Caroline, the daughter of the revolutionary Pantin. Caro helps teach Julien how to be a better swordsman.

When Baron La Mouche feels that there may be a connection between Guillaume de Saint Preux and the masked hero, he has Julien imprisoned. The original Black Tulip rescues him, but while Julien escapes, his brother is caught in the act and soon afterwards, executed.

In the end, Julien succeeds his brother as the Black Tulip. He rises to the occasion, and is now as good a fighter for justice as his brother was. He has also won the heart of Caroline, who supports him.

Cast
 Alain Delon – Julien de Saint Preux / Guillaume de Saint Preux
 Virna Lisi - Caroline „Caro“ Plantin
 Adolfo Marsillach – Baron La Mouche
 Dawn Addams – Marquise Catherine de Vigogne
 Akim Tamiroff – Marquis de Vigogne
 Laura Valenzuela – Lisette
 George Rigaud – Polizeichef
 Francis Blanche – Plantin
 José Jaspe – Brignon
 Robert Manuel as Prince Alexandre de Grassillac de Morvan-Le-Breau

Production
Delon made the film after seeing the success Jean-Paul Belmondo had in a swashbuckler, Cartouche (1962).

The film was shot on location in Spain, including Cáceres. Interiors were shot at the Victorine Studios in Nice.

Reception
The film was a big success at the French box office. It was the tenth most popular film of 1964, following The Troops of St. Tropez, The Sword in the Stone, From Russia with Love, That Man from Rio, Fantômas, The Train, Greed in the Sun, My Fair Lady and Weekend at Dunkirk.

Alain Delon used this opportunity to demonstrate his range as an actor by playing both brothers. In 1975, he would again play a masked swashbuckler in his Zorro film.

References

External links

Review of film at The Spinning Image

Films based on works by Alexandre Dumas
1960s historical adventure films
French historical adventure films
Italian historical adventure films
Spanish historical adventure films
French swashbuckler films
Films set in 1789
Films set in France
Films based on French novels
Films scored by Gérard Calvi
Films shot at Victorine Studios
Italian swashbuckler films
Spanish swashbuckler films
Films shot in the province of Cáceres
1960s French-language films
1960s Italian films
1960s French films